The Burton Commercial Historic District is located in Burton, Texas.

The district encompasses all or parts of seven city blocks. It contains 47 buildings, 28 of them classified as contributing. The buildings include retail stores, industrial buildings, a railroad depot and a portion of the railway right-of-way. The district was added to the National Register of Historic Places on June 11, 1991.

Buildings 
Notable buildings in the district include:
 H. Knittel Store Annex-one-story frame building constructed in 1880
 Meat Market-one-story brick building constructed around 1900 for F.W.E. Fischer, a prominent and early Burton merchant.
 Chamber of Commerce-Modern miniature frame building built around 1950 by Will Weeren.
 Farmer's Cotton Warehouse-one-story frame warehouse
 Homeyer Lumber Company-one-story frame building constructed around 1900. Lumber company was founded in 1881 by Charles W. Homeyer, a Burton resident.
 Old Burton State Bank-This one-story building served as Burton's first and only state bank from 1906 to 1965. Today it houses municipal offices.
 The Barber Shop-one-story building was built in 1906 for Fritz Buch as a grocery store. The barber shop operated from 1906 to 1986.
 Burton Auto Company-one-story building constructed in 1916 as the City Garage.

Gallery

See also

National Register of Historic Places listings in Washington County, Texas
Recorded Texas Historic Landmarks in Washington County

References

External links

National Register of Historic Places in Washington County, Texas
Geography of Washington County, Texas
Historic districts on the National Register of Historic Places in Texas
Commercial buildings on the National Register of Historic Places in Texas